Singureni may refer to:

Singureni, a commune in Giurgiu County, Romania
Singureni, a commune in Rîșcani District, Moldova